Simri Bakhtiarpur Assembly constituency is an assembly constituency in Saharsa district in the Indian state of Bihar.

Overview
As per Delimitation of Parliamentary and Assembly constituencies Order, 2008, No. 76 Simri Bakhtiarpur Assembly constituency  is composed of the following: Simri-Bakhtiarpur and Salkhua community development blocks; Ghoghepur, Jhara, Aeina, Maheshi North, Maheshi South, Rajanpur, Sirwar Naharwar gram panchayats of Mahishi CD Block.

Simri Bakhtiarpur Assembly constituency is part of No. 25 Khagaria (Lok Sabha constituency)
Present MP Mahboob Ali Qaiser and MLA Yusuf Salahuddin.

Members of Legislative Assembly

^-bypoll

Election results

1977-2010
In the 2010 state assembly elections, Dr. Arun Kumar of JD(U) won the Simri Bakhtirapur assembly seat defeating his nearest rival Choudhry Mehboob Ali Kaisar of Congress. Contests in most years were multi cornered but only winners and runners up are being mentioned. In the October 2005 and February 2005 state assembly elections Dinesh Chandra Yadav of JD(U) defeated Choudhry Mehboob Ali Kaiser of Congress and Zafar Alam of RJD respectively. Choudhry Md. Mehboob Ali Kaiser of Congress defeated Zafar Alam of RJD in 2000 and Dinesh Chandra Yadav of JD in 1995. Dinesh Chandra Yadav of JD defeated Mehboob Ali Kaiser of Congress in 1990. Choudhary Mohammad Salahuddin of Congress defeated Dinesh Chandra Yadav representing Lok Dal in 1985 and representing Janata Party (Secular – Charan Singh) in 1980, and Ayodhya Prasad Yadav, Independent, in 1977.

2020

References

External links
 

Assembly constituencies of Bihar
Politics of Saharsa district